Mokino is a rural locality (a selo) in Nytvensky District, Perm Krai, Russia. The population was 773 as of 2017. There are 8 streets.

Geography 
Mokino is located 26 km north of Nytva (the district's administrative centre) by road. Posnyata is the nearest rural locality.

References 

Rural localities in Perm Krai
Populated places in Nytvensky District